The 1988 Autosport 1000 km was the fourth round of the 1988 World Sportscar Championship season.  It took place at the Silverstone Circuit, United Kingdom on May 8, 1988.

Official results
Class winners in bold.  Cars failing to complete 75% of the winner's distance marked as Not Classified (NC).

† - The #14 Richard Lloyd Racing entry was disqualified after the race due to running a fuel cell which was too large.

Statistics
 Pole Position - #61 Team Sauber Mercedes - 1:15.020
 Fastest Lap - #62 Team Sauber Mercedes - 1:18.240
 Average Speed - 207.024 km/h

References

 
 

S
6 Hours of Silverstone
Silverstone 1000
Silverstone